Radiodiscus iheringi is a species of small air-breathing land snail, a terrestrial pulmonate gastropod mollusk in the family Charopidae.

This species was discovered and described by César Marie Félix Ancey as Stephanoda iheringi in 1899.

Fonseca and Thomé (1995) recombined it to Radiodiscus iheringi (Ancey, 1899) while they accidentally synonymized it with a newly created name Radiodiscus bolachaensis.

Saldago and Coelho (2003) clarified the situation: Endodonta iheringi Thiele, 1927 is a synonym for Radiodiscus bolachaensis Fonseca & Thomé, 1995.

Distribution 
This species is found in Argentina, Brazil, and Uruguay.

The type locality is Rio Grande do Sul, Brazil.

References 

Charopidae
Gastropods described in 1899
Taxa named by César Marie Félix Ancey
Taxonomy articles created by Polbot